The 2014 Seoul Open Women's Challenger was a professional tennis tournament played on outdoor hard courts. It was the first edition of the tournament and part of the 2014 ITF Women's Circuit, offering a total of $50,000 in prize money. It took place in Seoul, South Korea, on 21–27 April 2014.

Singles main draw entrants

Seeds 

 1 Rankings as of 14 April 2014

Other entrants 
The following players received wildcards into the singles main draw:
  Choi Ji-hee 
  Choi Su-yeon 
  Lee So-ra
  Lee Ye-ra

The following players received entry from the qualifying draw:
  Shiho Akita
  Chan Chin-wei
  Hong Hyun-hui
  Miki Miyamura

The following players received entry with a protected ranking:
  Akgul Amanmuradova
  Jarmila Gajdošová
  Ksenia Lykina

The following player received entry with a junior exempt:
  Ivana Jorović

Champions

Singles 

  Misaki Doi def.  Misa Eguchi 6–1, 7–6(7–3)

Doubles 

  Chan Chin-wei /  Chuang Chia-jung def.  Irena Pavlovic /  Kristýna Plíšková 6–4, 6–3

External links 
 2014 Seoul Open Women's Challenger at ITFtennis.com
  

2014 ITF Women's Circuit
2014
2014 in South Korean tennis
April 2014 sports events in Asia
Seoul Open Challenger